The barleycorn is an English unit of length equal to  of an inch (i.e. about ). It is still used as the basis of shoe sizes in English-speaking countries.

History

Under the c. AD 1300 Composition of Yards and Perches, one of the statutes of uncertain date that was notionally in force until the 1824 Weights and Measures Act, "3 barly cornes dry and rounde" were to serve as the basis for the inch and thence the larger units of feet, yards, perches and thus of the acre, an important unit of area. The notion of three barleycorns composing an inch certainly predates this statute, however, appearing in the 10th-century Welsh Laws of Hywel Dda.

In practice, various weights and measures acts of the English kings were standardized with reference to some particular yard-length iron, brass, or bronze bar held by the king or the Royal Exchequer.

See also
 List of unusual units of measurement

References

Units of length